The International Film Music Critics Association Award for Best Original Score for a Drama Film is an annual award given by the International Film Music Critics Association, or the IFMCA. The award is given to the composer of a film score for an action, science fiction and/or horror film deemed to be the best in a given year. The award was first given in 1998, but the genres were split, with action films, adventure films and thriller films being grouped into their own categories. In 2005, action and adventure films were grouped together, while horror films were grouped with thriller films. In 2007, action and thriller films were grouped together, with adventure being excluded from the title. They reverted to dual categories the following year. It has been awarded, consecutively, since 2010.

Winners and nominations

1990s

2000s

2010s

2020s

References

International Film Music Critics Association Awards